The following is an overview of the events that occurred in the year 2010 in the area of motorsports including the major racing events, motorsport venues that were opened and closed during a year, championships and non-championship events that were established and disestablished in a year, and birth and death of racing drivers and other motorsport people.

Annual events
The calendar includes only annual major non-championship events or annual events that had significance separate from the championship. For the dates of the championship events see related season articles.

Disestablished championships/events

See also
List of 2010 motorsport champions

References

External links

 
Motorsport by year